The Last Adventurer: The Life of Talbot Mundy is a biography and bibliography of Talbot Mundy by Peter Berresford Ellis.  It was released in 1984 by Donald M. Grant, Publisher, Inc. in an edition of 1,075 copies.

References

1984 non-fiction books
American biographies
Works by Peter Berresford Ellis
Donald M. Grant, Publisher books